Joaquim António Vasco Leite Pereira de Melo Ferreira Pinto Basto (11 December 1932 – 17 February 2008) was a Portuguese sailor who competed in the 1960 Summer Olympics and in the 1964 Summer Olympics.

References

1932 births
2008 deaths
Portuguese male sailors (sport)
Olympic sailors of Portugal
Sailors at the 1960 Summer Olympics – Dragon
Sailors at the 1964 Summer Olympics – Dragon